The Backbone One is an attachable game controller for iOS devices. Both the controller and the Backbone iOS app are created by Backbone. The app acts as a social hub and allows for editing and sharing recorded gameplay through social media platforms.

Description 
The Backbone One controller was designed in collaboration with Astro Studios and is supported by iPhone models from the iPhone 6S and running iOS 13 or later. It measures 176.2 by 93.9 by 32.6 millimetres (6.94 in × 3.70 in × 1.28 in) and weighs 138 grams (4.87 oz). The controller is operated by inserting an iPhone between the two handles of the device and connecting the iPhone's Lightning connector. It features a 3.5mm audio jack, which supports headsets with microphones, and a Lightning port that can be used for pass-through charging. Software functions like screen capture, launching the Backbone app, and muting the microphone are mapped to physical buttons on the device.

Backbone App 
On October 27, 2020, Backbone released the Backbone app, which features content creation tools and social features focused on controller-supported iOS applications and game streaming platforms. It features a "friends" list and allows players to add other Backbone players and view their online and in-game statuses. The app utilizes rich presence notifications to inform players when a friend plugs in a Backbone One or has invited them to a party chat. Up to 8 friends can join Backbone parties, which function as private voice chat rooms. The app features the ability to record gameplay up to 1080p at 30fps with a 20Mbit/s bitrate. Recordings are saved directly to the Backbone app with the option to later edit and share over social media and iMessage from within the app.

Compatibility 
The Backbone One controller is rated as an Apple-certified MFi controller. 

Applications from the App Store that support the MFi standard as a control scheme will allow for use with the device. 

The controller is featured as a recommended gamepad for Nvidia's cloud gaming service GeForce Now, and Microsoft's Xbox Cloud Gaming.

Development 
The Backbone One was developed by Backbone Labs, Inc., a company founded by CEO Maneet Khaira in mid-2018 while he was a student at Columbia University in New York. 

Khaira started the company to develop a more cohesive way to play games on mobile platforms.

Financing 
The company financed the production of its first product, Backbone One, through investments from MrBeast, Preston Arsement, Kwebbelkop, Typical Gamer, Night Media, and Nadeshot, as well as Ashton Kutcher and Guy Oseary’s Sound Ventures, 

which lead to the release of the Backbone One alongside the Backbone app on October 27; 2020.

Partnerships 
In March 2021, Backbone partnered with Nvidia to certify Backbone One as a recommended controller for their cloud gaming service GeForce Now. In June 2021, the company partnered with Microsoft to bring Xbox Cloud Gaming to iOS devices. The Backbone One controller was added to the "designed for Xbox" partner hardware program and was made available for purchase through the Microsoft Store. The Backbone One was also bundled with a 3-month trial of Xbox Game Pass. Backbone updated the Backbone app to feature several Xbox integrations and the packaging for the Backbone One was redesigned with official "Made for Xbox" branding.

References 

Game controllers
IOS software